Mary Ellen Snodgrass (born February 29, 1944) is an American educator and writer of textbooks and general reference works.

Biography
Snodgrass was born on February 29, 1944, in Wilmington, North Carolina, to William and Lucy Robinson. She attended University of North Carolina at Greensboro (1966) and Appalachian State University and is a member of Phi Beta Kappa.

Snodgrass taught English and Latin at Hickory High School and Lenoir Rhyne University for 23 years. She is a member of the North Carolina Library Board and in 2013 chaired VOYA's nonfiction honor list selection committee. Snodgrass has reviewed reference books for Booklist, Choice Reviews, Isis, and others and has won several reference books-of-the-year awards from the American Library Association, Choice, and Library Journal. Her books have also been named editor's choice by the Hickory Daily Record, Booklist, and the New York Public Library.

Personal life
She married Hugh Snodgrass in 1984 and has a foster daughter, Deborah. She lives in Hickory, North Carolina.

Selected works

Encyclopedias

Literary companions

Cliffs Notes

References

Appalachian State University alumni
1944 births
Living people
University of North Carolina at Greensboro alumni
American non-fiction writers
American women non-fiction writers
People from Hickory, North Carolina